Reclaimed is a mining reality television series that premiered on the Discovery Channel on January 9, 2020. The show focuses on rescuing mines that the claim owners are having trouble exploiting. Other than mining, other ways to exploit land claims are also explored, such as wilderness excursion camping, cottages, hunting; bush agriculture, and building mining camps, accesses, and facilities. The series was hosted by Alex Charvat and Kevin Gilman. For filming, the series received a tax credit from the Colorado Office of Economic Development.

See also

 2020 in American television

References

2020 American television series debuts
2020s American reality television series
Discovery Channel original programming